Este may refer to:

Geography 
 Este (woreda), a district in Ethiopia 
 Este, Veneto, a town in Italy
 Este (Málaga), a district in Spain
 Este (river), a river in Germany
 Este (São Pedro), a parish in Portugal
 Este (São Mamede), a parish in Portugal

People 
 House of Este, a European dynasty
 Dukes of Ferrara and of Modena, the Italian family of Este
 Este culture, a proto-historic culture existed from the late Italian Bronze Age
 Aquiles Este (born 1962), American semiotician
 Charles Este (1696–1745), bishop of Ossory and Waterford and Lismore
 Florence Esté (1860–1926), American painter
 Este Haim (born 1986), American musician

Other uses 
 A.C. Este, an association football club based in Este, Veneto
 Estë, a fictional character in J. R. R. Tolkien's legendarium

See also 
 East (disambiguation)
 Estes, a surname
 
 

Surnames of Italian origin
Orientation (geometry)